Barkhuizen v Napier is an important case in South African contract law, decided by the Constitutional Court on 4 April 2007, having been heard on 4 May 2006. The judges were Langa CJ, Moseneke DCJ, Madala J, Mokgoro J, Ngcobo J, Nkabinde J, O'Regan J, Sachs J, Skweyiya J, Van Der Westhuizen J and Yacoob J.

Facts 
When the applicant (the insured) instituted action in a High Court against the respondent (the insurer) on a short-term insurance contract, the insurer raised a special plea that it had been released from liability under the contract, since the applicant had failed to institute the action within the time period specified in the contract, namely ninety days from the date of repudiation of the claim.

The applicant replicated that the time-limitation clause was unconstitutional and unenforceable because it violated his right under the Constitution of the Republic of South Africa to have the matter determined by a court.

The High Court upheld the applicant's contention, created an order declaring the time-limitation clause to be inconsistent with the Constitution and dismissed the special plea.

On appeal to the Supreme Court of Appeal (SCA), it was found that section 34 of the Constitution did not prevent time-bar provisions in contracts that were entered into freely and voluntarily, but that it could not be determined on the evidence whether the clause under consideration had been entered into freely and voluntarily. The SCA accordingly upheld the appeal (and the special plea).

The applicant then approached the Constitutional Court (CC) for leave to appeal against the decision of the SCA. Before the CC, the respondent contended inter alia that the provisions of section 34 had no application to constitutional challenges to contractual terms.

Judgment 
The CC held that public policy has to be determined with reference to the Constitution, so that a contractual term which violates the Constitution is by definition contrary to public policy and therefore unenforceable. The proper approach to constitutional challenges to contractual terms is to determine whether the term challenged is contrary to public policy as evidenced by South Africa's constitutional values, in particular those found in the Bill of Rights. Section 34, therefore, not only reflected the foundational values that underlie the constitutional order, but also constituted public policy. The court determined that the proper approach to the present matter was to determine whether the time-limitation clause violated section 34 of the Constitution and was thus contrary to public policy.

As a matter of public policy, the court held

 that, subject to considerations of reasonableness and fairness, time-limitation clauses in contracts are permissible; and
 that the right to seek judicial redress (as guaranteed by section 34) may be limited in circumstances where
 it is sanctioned by a law of general application; and
 the limitation is reasonable and justifiable.

It approved the words of Cameron JA that,

While it is therefore necessary to recognise the doctrine of pacta sunt servanda, the courts may decline the enforcement of a time-limitation clause if its implementation would result in unfairness or would be unreasonable for being contrary to public policy.

The test for reasonableness, the court found, was whether or not the clause afforded the claimant an adequate and fair opportunity to seek judicial redress. If a contractual term provides only for an impossibly short time for the dispute to be referred to a court of law, it is contrary to public policy and unenforceable.

As to the requirement of fairness, the court laid out a two-part test:

 whether the clause itself is unreasonable; and, if not,
 whether it should be enforced in light of the circumstances that prevent compliance.

The first part entails a weighing-up of the principle of pacta sunt servanda and the right of all persons to seek judicial redress. The second part entails proof by the claimant that he has good reason for his non-compliance with the time-limitation clause. In that regard, the relative equality or inequality of the bargaining positions of the parties is a relevant consideration.

In the present case,

 the ninety-day time limitation was not manifestly unreasonable;
 nor was it manifestly unfair: There was no evidence that the contract had not been freely concluded between parties in equal bargaining positions or that the clause was not drawn to the applicant's attention. In the circumstances, enforcement of the clause would not be contrary to public policy.

The difficulty in the present case was that the applicant had not furnished the reasons for his non-compliance with the time-limitation clause. Without those facts, the court was unable to say whether the enforcement of the clause against the applicant would be unfair and therefore contrary to public policy. The Court was compelled to conclude, then, that enforcement of the clause would not be unjust to the applicant. It followed that the special plea was well taken. The appeal was dismissed.

See also 
 South African contract law

Notes

References

Books 
 Du Plessis, Jacques, et al. The Law of Contract in South Africa. Edited by Dale Hutchison, Chris-James Pretorius, Mark Townsend and Helena Janisch. Cape Town, Western Cape: Oxford University Press, 2010.

Cases 
 Barkhuizen v Napier 2007 (5) SA 323 (CC).

2007 in South African law
2007 in case law
South African contract case law
Constitutional Court of South Africa cases